The 1903 Tour de France was the 1st edition of Tour de France, one of cycling's Grand Tours. The Tour began in Paris on 1 July and Stage 4 occurred on 12 July with a flat stage from Toulouse. The race finished at the Parc des Princes in Paris on 18 July.

Stage 4
12 July 1903 — Toulouse to Bordeaux,

Stage 5
13 July 1903 — Bordeaux to Nantes,

Stage 6
18 July 1903 — Nantes to Paris,

References

Further reading

1903 Tour de France
Tour de France stages